Zhai Xiaowen (born 28 May 1999), is a Chinese singer and actor. He is known for his participation in the survival reality show Produce Camp 2019, where he finished in sixth place, and is a former member of the show's boy group R1SE. He is also known for his roles in Falling Into Your Smile and Sweet Teeth.

Early life
Zhai Xiaowen was born on May 28, 1999, in Jinan, Shandong, China. For the first time in his life, the idea of ​​wanting to become an artist came from watching the TV series "Han Zhu Ge Ge" at home as a child. After college, because he felt that someone was 18 or 19 years old and qualified to do things he might not believe in, he decided to go on stage to give it a try, so he participated in the draft competition.

Filmography

Television series

Variety shows

Discography

Singles

Soundtrack appearances

References

External links

1999 births
Living people
R1SE members
Singers from Shandong
Chinese male singers
Chinese Mandopop singers
Produce 101 (Chinese TV series) contestants
Chinese male television actors